Single Bullet Theory may refer to:

Single Bullet Theory (new wave band), American new wave band from Richmond, Virginia
Single Bullet Theory (metal band), American heavy metal band from Philadelphia, Pennsylvania